Carlos Cubillos (26 December 1929 – 22 September 2003) was a Chilean footballer. He played in 15 matches for the Chile national football team from 1955 to 1957. He was also part of Chile's squad for the 1956 South American Championship.

References

External links
 

1929 births
2003 deaths
Chilean footballers
Chile international footballers
Place of birth missing
Association football midfielders
Colo-Colo footballers
Santiago Wanderers footballers
Unión Española footballers
Santiago Morning footballers
San Luis de Quillota footballers
Coquimbo Unido footballers
San Antonio Unido footballers